Chapman Levy Anderson (March 15, 1845 – April 27, 1924) was a U.S. Representative from Mississippi, serving two terms from 1887 to 1891. A Confederate Army veteran, he was a member of the Democratic Party.

Biography 
Born near Macon, Mississippi, Anderson attended the common schools in Jackson, Mississippi, and the University of Mississippi at Oxford. In 1861, he enlisted in the Confederate States Army on March 5, 1862, as a private in the Thirty-ninth Regiment, Mississippi Volunteer Infantry.
He was promoted through the successive grades of noncommissioned officer until July 1864, when he was transferred to Bradford's cavalry corps of scouts with the rank of second lieutenant, in which capacity he served until the close of the war. He studied law and was admitted to the bar in 1868.

He commenced practice in Kosciusko, Mississippi. He served as mayor of Kosciusko, Mississippi in 1875. He served as member of the Mississippi House of Representatives in 1879 and 1880.

Congress 
Anderson was elected as a Democrat to the Fiftieth and Fifty-first Congresses (March 4, 1887 – March 3, 1891). He was an unsuccessful candidate for renomination in 1890.

Anderson's Republican opponent, Marsh Cook, contested the election results. Cook was ambushed and murdered by a gang of white supremacists in 1890 while campaigning to be a delegate at Mississippi's 1890 Constitutional Convention.

Later career and death 
He served as United States district attorney for the northern district of Mississippi in 1896 and 1897.

He worked at his law office in Kosciusko, Mississippi, until his death, April 27, 1924. He was interred in Kosciusko Cemetery.

References

Sources

1845 births
1924 deaths
Confederate States Army officers
Democratic Party members of the Mississippi House of Representatives
Mayors of places in Mississippi
People from Kosciusko, Mississippi
United States Attorneys for the Northern District of Mississippi
People from Macon, Mississippi
Democratic Party members of the United States House of Representatives from Mississippi